Cindi Di Natale is an Argentine racing cyclist. She competed in the 2013 UCI women's road race in Florence.

References

External links

Year of birth missing (living people)
Living people
Argentine female cyclists
Place of birth missing (living people)
21st-century Argentine women